The Chogyal ("Dharma Kings") were the monarchs of the former Kingdom of Sikkim, which belonged to the Namgyal dynasty. The Chogyal was the absolute monarch of Sikkim from 1642 to 1973, and the constitutional monarch from 1973 to 1975, when the monarchy was abolished and the Sikkimese people voted in a referendum to make Sikkim the 22nd state of India.

History 

From 1642 to 1975, Sikkim was ruled by the Namgyal Monarchy (also called the Chogyal Monarchy), founded by Phuntsog Namgyal, the fifth-generation descendant of Guru Tashi, a prince of the Minyak House who came to Sikkim from the Kham province of Tibet. Chogyal means 'righteous ruler', and was the title conferred upon Sikkim's Buddhist kings during the reign of the Namgyal Monarchy.

The reign of the Chogyal was foretold by the patron saint of Sikkim, Guru Rinpoche. The 8th-century saint had predicted the rule of the kings when he arrived in the state. In 1642, Phuntsog Namgyal was crowned as Sikkim's first Chogyal in Yuksom. The crowning of the king was a great event and he was crowned by three revered lamas who arrived there from three different directions, namely the north, west, and south.

Chogyal kings of Sikkim

List of chogyals

Titular chogyals 
The son from the first marriage of Palden Thondup Namgyal, Wangchuk Namgyal (born 1 April 1953), was named the 13th Chogyal after his father's death on 29 January 1982, but the position no longer confers any official authority.

Royal Flag

Rulers of other Himalayan kingdoms

Druk Gyalpo of Bhutan 

In Bhutan, "dharmaraja"  or "Righteous King" is a title which was also conferred upon a special class of temporal and spiritual rulers. In Bhutan, the Chogyal were given the respectful title Zhabdrung. In this context, the Chogyal was a recognised reincarnation (or succession of reincarnations) of Shabdrung Ngawang Namgyal, the 17th century Tibetan-born founder of Bhutan. A position of supreme importance, the Bhutanese Chogyal was above both the highest monastic authority, the Je Khenpo, and the highest temporal ruler, the Deb Raja or Druk Desi. There were two main lines of Zhabdrung incarnations in Bhutan.

Gyalpo of Ladakh 

The region of Ladakh was ruled by a separate line of the Namgyal dynasty that lasted from 1460 to 1842 and were titled the Gyalpo of Ladakh.

See also 
 Dharmaraja
 Devaraja
 Garpön
 History of Sikkim
 History of Ladakh

Notes

References 

Sikkim monarchy
Monarchs of Sikkim
Sikkim